Starburst amacrine cells are a type of amacrine cells found in the retina. These interneurons are notable for co-releasing acetylcholine and GABA.

References

External links 
 Starburst Amacrine Cell on Eyewire.org.

Neurons